Lycée Alfred Kastler de Cergy-Pontoise is a senior high school located in Pontoise, Val-d'Oise, France, in the Paris metropolitan area, serving both Pontoise and Cergy.

It opened on 15 September 1978 as the Lycée de Cergy Ville Nouvelle and it was renamed after Alfred Kastler on 7 February 1989.

Students originate from, in addition to Pointoise and Cergy, Éragny, Gency, Herblay, Jouy le Moutier, Magny en Vexin, and Osny.  there are 315 students.

References

External links
 Lycée Alfred Kastler de Cergy-Pontoise 

Lycées in Val-d'Oise
1978 establishments in France
Educational institutions established in 1978
Lycées in Cergy-Pontoise